Hal Mason may refer to:

Hal Mason, character in Falling Skies
Hal Mason, character in Sensation Comics
Hal Mason, character in Sons and Daughters (Australian TV series)

See also
Henry Mason (disambiguation)
Harold Mason (disambiguation)
Harry Mason (disambiguation)